Zafiro or Zafiros means sapphire in Spanish and may refer to:

 the zafiro Mexicano or Mexican woodnymph, a species of hummingbird found only in Mexico
 USS Zafiro, a collier that served in the United States Navy from 1898 to 1904
 the Zafiro offshore oilfield in Equatorial Guinea
 Los Zafiros Cuban vocal group
 Los Zafiros (Spanish band) Spanish group, one of whom was Jose Luis Paris
 Zafiro Hotels, a small hotel chain in the Spanish Balearic Islands offering 4&5 star premium hotels. 
 Zafiro, a company operating from Madrid, which published games for the MSX in the 1980s.